Thomas James Fallon (1899 – June 13, 1929) was an American football guard and end in the National Football League. He played with the Milwaukee Badgers during the 1922 NFL season. He played college football at Fordham.

Early life and career
Fallon was born in Rye, New York and attended Springfield YMCA College in 1919. He transferred to Fordham in 1920, where he played football, baseball and basketball, and occasionally took part in track and field competitions. He was named the captain of the basketball team in March of 1921. He later played for the Shenandoah Yellow Jackets in 1923.

Death
After football, Fallon worked as a manager for Edison Radio Company in Seattle, Washington. On June 13, 1929, after following an argument over his wife's hat, Fallon died after jumping from a seven-story hotel window.

References

1899 births
1929 deaths
Milwaukee Badgers players
American football offensive guards
Fordham Rams football players
Fordham Rams men's basketball players
Fordham Rams baseball players